Vincenzo Pepe (born 4 April 1987) is an Italian footballer who plays for Eccellenza club Palazzolo.

Club career

Early career
Born in Naples, Campania, Pepe was signed by Parma at young age. Pepe was in the Giovanissimi Nazionali squad in 2001–02 season, that team had Giuseppe Rossi and Arturo Lupoli as forward. He appeared twice as unused bench for Parma at 2004–05 UEFA Cup., wearing no.39 shirt. That season Pepe also a member of Primavera under-20 Team He was eligible as List B player (club youth product) In mid-2005 he left for Sambenedettese in co-ownership deal and made his professional debut. In January 2006 Pescara bought the 50% registration rights from Sambenedettese. He was awarded no.15 shirt of the first team. In June 2006 Parma gave up the remain 50% registration rights. Pepe then left for Cremonese on loan and in 2007–08 season turned to another co-ownership deal for €80,000. In June 2008 Pescara bought back Pepe by submitting a higher bid to Lega Calcio Serie C than Cremonese, a mechanism to decide the co-ownership if both clubs failed to submit an agreement before the deadline.

Pepe was included in Pescara's pre-season camp. However he was excluded from the club plan and sold to Serie B club Avellino on 1 September.

Avellino
On 1 September 2008 Pepe was signed by Avellino. Avellino was relegated in 2008 and but re-admitted to 2008–09 Serie B. In his first season in the second division, Pepe was a regular member of the starting eleven (21 starts), scoring 3 goals.  However the Campania club relegated again in 2009 and expelled from the professional due to the financial test by FIGC. Pepe also became a free agent.

Salernitana
In July 2009 he was signed by another Serie B team Salernitana. He only made 16 starts in the first season with only 1 goal. Salernitana relegated after the season. In 2010–11 Lega Pro Prima Divisione, he only played 5 games until December 2010. It was reported that the club formed a swap deal with Triestina, but the deadline day deal collapsed and Nicola Princivalli remained in Trieste. Since December Pepe did not play any game for the Campania club. Salernitana lost the final of promotion playoff and folded after failing to acquire a license from FIGC.

Siracusa
In July 2011 he joined another third division club Siracusa. He secured a place in starting line-up since 30 October (round 10). He mainly played as a winger/wing forward in 4–2–3–1/4–3–3 formation or as a midfielder in 4–4–2 formation (when Marco Mancosu was rested) Before the winter break, Siracusa was the first in Group B.

Pepe also played in the first round of 2011–12 Coppa Italia. However Pepe in fact ineligible after sent off in his previous cup match for Salernitana. But no punish was given due to no one discover his ineligibility before the deadline of compliant.

Lanciano
After Siracusa was expelled from 2012–13 Lega Pro Prima Divisione, Pepe was signed by Serie B newcomer Lanciano in 2-year contract as a free agent. In January 2013 he was signed by Nocerina. In August 2013 Pepe was sold to Pro Vercelli, with Umberto Germano moved to Lanciano in temporary deal.

Lega Pro clubs
On 24 August 2013 Pepe was signed by Pro Vercelli. The club won promotion to 2014–15 Serie B.

In 2014 Pepe was signed by Messina.

In January 2015 Pepe was released. He joined another Lega Pro club Martina.

Serie D club
In November 2015 Pepe was signed by Abano.

Potenza
On 23 August 2016, he signed with Potenza.

Avellino return
On 24 January 2019 he joined Avellino in Serie D.

Palazzolo
In September 2019 Pepe was signed by Eccellenza club Palazzolo.

International career
Pepe capped for Italy under-16 team in June 2003. He failed to win a cap from the main team but capped for its feeder team Serie C representative teams. He played for Serie C U-19 in a training match and U-20 team in 2006–07 Mirop Cup against Slovakia and Hungary. He also represented "U-20 C" against Italy U-21 B in December 2007. Pepe played in 2007–09 International Challenge Trophy. (He missed the third match as not eligible) Pepe also won the annual U-21 Serie C1 tournament with Serie C1 Group A representatives in January 2007 and January 2008.

References

External links
 FIGC  
 Lega Serie B Profile 
 Football.it Profile 
 
 

1987 births
Footballers from Naples
Living people
Italian footballers
Association football wingers
Italy youth international footballers
Parma Calcio 1913 players
A.S. Sambenedettese players
Delfino Pescara 1936 players
U.S. Cremonese players
Venezia F.C. players
U.S. Avellino 1912 players
U.S. Salernitana 1919 players
U.S. Siracusa players
S.S. Virtus Lanciano 1924 players
A.S.G. Nocerina players
F.C. Pro Vercelli 1892 players
A.C.R. Messina players
A.S. Martina Franca 1947 players
S.S. Ischia Isolaverde players
Potenza Calcio players
A.S.D. S.C. Palazzolo players
Serie B players
Serie C players
Serie D players